Community Boating, Inc. (CBI) is a private not-for-profit corporation run in association with the Massachusetts Department of Conservation and Recreation. Located on the Charles River Esplanade between the Hatch Shell and the Longfellow Bridge Community Boating is the oldest public sailing organization in the United States. 

CBI was founded by Joe Lee, an affluent Bostonian with an eye for social justice and a penchant for rebellion. He realized that sailing could enrich the lives of children who lived in Boston's working-class West End neighborhood. Starting in the 1930s, his “Lee Boys” began venturing onto the Charles with plywood sailboats and makeshift canvas sails, dodging conflicts with skeptical state officials and well-heeled nearby boat clubs.

Lee's program gradually grew less mischievous and more formal, but his kids insisted that the city needed a permanent place for cheap public sailing. They were ultimately successful: CBI was officially incorporated in 1946, and it earned 501(c)3 status by 1951.

Leonard Nimoy learned to sail here as a child.

References

External links 

Boating associations
Non-profit organizations based in Boston
1936 establishments in Massachusetts